Aeromonas fluvialis is a Gram-negative, oxidase- and catalase-positive, facultatively anaerobic, non-spore-forming bacterium of the genus Aeromonas isolated from water from the Muga River in Girona in northeastern Spain.

References

External links
Type strain of Aeromonas fluvialis at BacDive -  the Bacterial Diversity Metadatabase

Aeromonadales
Bacteria described in 2010